This Is Menace was a British metalcore supergroup formed in 2004.

History
The band was formed by bassist Mark Clayden and drummer Jason Bowld during the hiatus of their previous band, Pitchshifter. The group released their limited EP, Collusion in 2005. Shortly after that the band released their debut album No End in Sight in 2005.

The band released their second album, The Scene Is Dead, in 2007, along with the Emotion Sickness DVD, featuring live shows and a "making of" segment. In 2008, the project was terminated.

In 2020, Pitchshifter's social media accounts announced a final This Is Menace album entitled isM; the album is a compilation of songs from the two previous albums, with one additional unreleased song called "Redisposed".

Members
Last line-up
 Jason Bowld – drums, lead guitar, rhythm guitar vocals
 Mark Clayden – bass, lead guitar, rhythm guitar, vocals
 Lee Erinmez – bass
 Paul Fletcher – guitar
 Gerald Walton – guitar
 Owen Packard – guitar

Guest vocalists
 Jaz Coleman of Killing Joke
 B'Hellmouth of Send More Paramedics
 Charlie Simpson of Fightstar
 J.S. Clayden of Pitchshifter
 Ben Woosnam of Hondo Maclean
 Colin Doran of Hundred Reasons
 Matt Davies of Funeral for a Friend
 Justin Hill of SikTh
 Mikee Goodman of SikTh
 Casey Chaos of Amen
 Paul McCallion of Hiding Place
 Jeffrey Walker of Carcass
 Andy Cairns of Therapy?
 Tom Lacey of The Ghost of a Thousand
 Karl Middleton of earthtone9
 Paul Catten of Murder One
 Mark Greenway of Napalm Death
 Justin Sullivan of New Model Army
 Anthony Giles of Here There Be Monsters

Discography
Studio albums
 No End in Sight (2005)
 The Scene Is Dead (2007)

Compilations
 isM (2020)

EP
 Collusion (2005)

DVD
 Emotion Sickness (2007)

Artwork
This Is Menace album and DVD artwork by DOSE-productions.

References

External links
Official Website (Defunct)

English metalcore musical groups
Musical groups established in 2004
Heavy metal supergroups
British industrial metal musical groups